Joe Palooka in the Knockout is a 1947 American comedy film directed by Reginald Le Borg. It was the third part of the Joe Palooka series from Monogram Pictures starring Joe Kirkwood, Jr. as the boxer and Leon Errol as his manager. The film also featured Elyse Knox, Marc Lawrence and Trudy Marshall

Plot

A distraught Joe Palooka doesn't want to fight any more after believing he killed an opponent in the ring. Joe doesn't know that gamblers John Mitchell and Howard Abbott conspired to drug the victim by blackmailing his manager, Max Steele, who unwittingly caused the boxer's death.

Joe's manager Knobby Walsh and a pal, Sam "Glass Jaw" Wheeler, fail to console Joe, but the dead boxer's fiancee, singer Nina Carroll, explains to Joe how he wasn't responsible. Joe proceeds to help police investigate the crime. It turns out Sam is actually an undercover cop.

A furious Max ends up killing Mitchell out of revenge. Nightclub owner Abbott, after hiring Nina to sing, plots to have Joe killed in his upcoming bout by once again using a poisoned mouthguard. Knobby and a helpful dog save Joe just in time.

Cast

 Leon Errol as Knobby
 Joe Kirkwood, Jr. as Joe Palooka
 Elyse Knox as 	Anne Howe
 Sarah Padden as Ma Palooka
 Marc Lawrence as Mitchell
 Trudy Marshall as Nina
 Whitford Kane as Steele
 Billy House as Sam
 Benny Baker as 	Looie
 Morris Carnovsky as Abbott
 Dave Barry as Eddie Steele
 Donald MacBride as Crockett
 Danny Morton as Pusher Moore
 Vince Barnett as 	Russell
 Clarence Muse as 	Smoky
 Michael Mark as Pop Palooka 
 Chester Clute as 	Hotel Clerk
 Eddie Gribbon as 	Canvasback
 James Flavin as 	Policeman
 Ray Walker as Reporter

References

Bibliography
 Drew, Bernard A. Motion Picture Series and Sequels: A Reference Guide. Routledge, 2013.

External links
Joe Palooka in the Knockout at IMDb
Joe Palooka in the Knockout at TCMDB

1947 films
1940s sports films
American black-and-white films
American boxing films
Monogram Pictures films
Films based on American comics
Films directed by Reginald Le Borg
1940s American films
Joe Palooka films